is a Japanese politician and previously was a member of the House of Councillors. He is the former Chairman of the Social Democratic Party.

External links 
Official website in Japanese.

1944 births
Living people
Members of the House of Councillors (Japan)
People from Toyama (city)
Social Democratic Party (Japan) politicians